Avakasi is a 1954 Indian Malayalam-language film, directed by Antony Mitradas and produced by P. Subramaniam. The film stars Prem Nazir and Miss Kumari. The film had musical score by Br. Lakshmanan.

This film was dubbed into Tamil with the title Avan Yaar and released in 1954. Kambadasan wrote the screenplay and lyrics.

Cast
 Prem Nazir as Vijayan
 Pankajavalli as Madhavi
 S. P. Pillai as Marthandan
 Miss Kumari as Kumari
 Adoor Pankajam as Sheelavathi
 Nanukkuttan as Thrivikraman Thampi
 Kottarakkara Sreedharan Nair as Prathapan
 Ambalappuzha Rajamma as Paarvathi
 Ambalappuzha Meenakshi
 T. S. Muthaiah as Kurup
 Soman as Rudran
 Sreekantan Nair
 Muthukulam Raghavan Pilla as Manmadan
 Sethulakshmi (Old)
 Bahadoor

References

External links
 

1954 films
1950s Malayalam-language films
Films directed by Antony Mitradas